A Chinese Life is a 2012 French graphic novel co-written by Li Kunwu and Philippe Ôtié and illustrated by Li Kunwu. Edward Gauvin translated the book into English. The book describes Li Kunwu's life during the Cultural Revolution. Kana published the French version, and SelfMadeHero published the English translation.

Li Kunwu (born 1955), an artist, received a proposal to make a graphic novel about his life in 2005. The co-writer, Ôtié, worked for the French Embassy as a commercial counselor/advisor to Yunnan. It was first published in France; the first volume was published in 2009, and the third and final volume was published in 2011. In 2012 the English version was published in one volume.

Clément Benech of Libération described it as somewhat of an equivalent of Vie Française by Jean-Paul Dubois.

Reception

James Smart of The Guardian wrote that "This ambitious graphic novel pulls you to the chest of the world's latest superpower, shows you something of what it has gained and lost, and lets you go, 60 years later, drained and intrigued and feeling as though you know China's great, tangled present a little bit better."

References

2009 graphic novels
Autobiographical graphic novels
Books about China
French graphic novels